Charlestown is a town in Sullivan County, New Hampshire, United States. The population was 4,806 at the 2020 census, down from 5,114 at the 2010 census. The town is home to Hubbard State Forest and the headquarters of the Student Conservation Association.

The primary village in town, where 1,078 people resided at the 2020 census, is defined as the Charlestown census-designated place (CDP) and is located along New Hampshire Route 12. The town also includes the villages of North Charlestown, South Charlestown and Hemlock Center.

History

The area was first granted on December 31, 1735,<ref name="1875Charlestown">Article in [http://gedcomindex.com/Reference/New_Hampshire_1875/088.html Statistics and Gazetteer of New-Hampshire (1875)]</ref> by colonial governor Jonathan Belcher of Massachusetts as "Plantation No. 4", the fourth in a line of townships on the Connecticut Rivers. Settled in 1740, it was the northernmost township, and its 1744 stockade now known as Fort at Number 4 became a strategic military site. On the evening of May 2, 1746, Seth Putnam joined Major Josiah Willard and several soldiers as they escorted women to milk the cows. As they approached the barn, Natives hiding in the bushes opened fire, killing Putnam, "the first victim of [Native] vengeance". In 1747, during King George's War, the fort was besieged for three days by a force of French and Native people. Captain Phineas Stevens and 31 militia stationed at the fort repelled the attack, with their success becoming well-known.

On July 2, 1753, the town was rechartered as "Charlestown" by Governor Benning Wentworth, after Admiral Charles Knowles of the Royal Navy, then governor of Jamaica. Admiral Knowles, in port at Boston during the 1747 siege, sent Captain Stevens a sword to acknowledge his valor. The town responded by naming itself in his honor.

Early in the morning of August 30, 1754, Susannah Willard Johnson along with her husband, her three children, her sister and two neighbors, Peter Labarree and Ebenezer Farnsworth, were captured by Abenaki people, marched to Montreal and incarcerated. Eventually they would all escape or be released and return home.

In 1781, Charlestown briefly joined Vermont because of dissatisfaction with treatment by the New Hampshire government. Returning at the insistence of George Washington, it was incorporated in 1783.

The community developed into a center for law and lawyers, second regionally only to Boston. Its prosperity would be expressed in fine architecture. Sixty-three buildings on Charlestown's Main Street are now listed on the National Register of Historic Places. They include the Gothic Revival South Parish Church erected by master-builder Stephen Hassam in 1842, St. Luke's Church designed by Richard Upjohn in 1863, and the Italianate Town Hall designed in 1872 by Edward Dow, New Hampshire's most prominent architect after the Civil War. Dow also designed Thompson Hall, the centerpiece of the University of New Hampshire.

In 1874, the Sullivan Railroad passed through the western side of Charlestown. The tracks are now part of the New England Central Railroad.

A reproduction of the Fort at Number 4 is now a historical site, where military reenactments and musters occur frequently throughout the summer months. Tours are offered of its stockaded parade ground and pioneer-style houses.

Geography
Charlestown is located along the Connecticut River, the western border of New Hampshire.

Charlestown is drained by several direct tributaries of the Connecticut River: Ox Brook, the Little Sugar River, Beaver Brook, Clay Brook, Dickerson Brook, and Jabes Meadow Brook.

In the Connecticut River in the 1800s were three islands within the limits of the town. Sartwell's Island, the largest, containing , was under high cultivation in 1874. The others contained about  each. None show on maps today, and were presumably inundated by the power dam built downstream at Bellows Falls.

Adjacent municipalities
 Claremont, New Hampshire (north)
 Unity, New Hampshire (northeast)
 Acworth, New Hampshire (east)
 Langdon, New Hampshire (south)
 Walpole, New Hampshire (south)
 Rockingham, Vermont (southwest)
 Springfield, Vermont (west)

Transportation
Charlestown is served by New Hampshire Routes 11, 12 and 12A. Routes 11 and 12 lead north from the town center  to downtown Claremont. Route 11 leads northwest from the center of Charlestown to the Cheshire Bridge (the old toll bridge) across the Connecticut River, after which it becomes Vermont Route 11 and provides access to Interstate 91 and U.S. Route 5 in Vermont.

Bus service is available from Community Alliance Transport Services (CATS), with several buses a day connecting Charlestown and Claremont.

The New England Central Railroad has track rights through the town. Amtrak's Vermonter'' passenger rail line runs through Charlestown along the Connecticut River but does not stop in town. The closest stations are Bellows Falls to the south and Claremont to the north.

The nearest general aviation airports are Claremont Municipal Airport,  to the north, and Hartness State Airport in North Springfield, Vermont,  to the northwest. The nearest airport with scheduled airline service is Lebanon Municipal Airport,  to the north in West Lebanon.

Public safety 
Charlestown is served by a full-time police department and volunteer fire department. Charlestown's ambulance service is provided by Golden Cross Ambulance out of Claremont. The town's emergency services are dispatched by the Charlestown Police Department dispatch center.

Charlestown falls within Troop C of the New Hampshire State Police.

Demographics

As of the census of 2010, there were 5,114 people, 2,117 households, and 1,399 families residing in the town. There were 2,263 housing units, of which 146, or 6.5%, were vacant. The racial makeup of the town was 97.8% white, 0.4% African American, 0.2% Native American, 0.4% Asian, 0.0% Native Hawaiian or Pacific Islander, 0.1% some other race, and 1.0% from two or more races. 0.8% of the population were Hispanic or Latino of any race.

Of the 2,117 households, 28.8% had children under the age of 18 living with them, 50.4% were headed by married couples living together, 10.0% had a female householder with no husband present, and 33.9% were non-families. 27.4% of all households were made up of individuals, and 11.3% were someone living alone who was 65 years of age or older. The average household size was 2.38, and the average family size was 2.84.

In the town, 20.7% of the population were under the age of 18, 7.7% were from 18 to 24, 23.3% from 25 to 44, 32.4% from 45 to 64, and 16.2% were 65 years of age or older. The median age was 43.9 years. For every 100 females, there were 97.2 males. For every 100 females age 18 and over, there were 94.4 males.

For the period 2011–2015, the estimated median annual income for a household was $41,471, and the median income for a family was $52,708. The per capita income for the town was $23,527. 13.2% of the population and 9.5% of families were below the poverty line. 16.0% of the population under the age of 18 and 9.1% of those 65 or older were living in poverty.

Sites of interest
 Charlestown Main Street Historic District

Notable people 

 Helen Louisa Bostwick Bird (1826–1907), author, poet
 James Broderick (1927–1982), actor; father of Matthew Broderick
 William E. Corbin (1869–1951), inventor of the paper towel
 George Brintnall Dutton (1818-1898), Minnesota territorial legislator and lawyer
 Carlton "Pudge" Fisk (born 1947), Hall of Fame catcher with the Boston Red Sox and Chicago White Sox
 Joseph Glidden (1813–1906), businessman, farmer; inventor of modern barbed wire
 Charles H. Hoyt (1859–1900), playwright, theatrical producer
 Henry Hubbard (1784–1857), US congressman, senator, 18th governor of New Hampshire
 Samuel Hunt (1765–1807), US congressman
 Susannah Willard Johnson (1729–1810), Anglo-American woman who was captured with her family during an Abenaki Indian raid, and then held for ransom until being sold off into slavery to the French
 Benjamin Labaree (1801–1883), minister, professor and college president
 Ralph Metcalf (1796–1858), 25th governor of New Hampshire
 Simeon Olcott (1735–1815), attorney, US senator
 DeForest Richards (1846–1903), banker, farmer, fifth governor of Wyoming
 Richard H. Sylvester (1830–1895), journalist
 James Tufts (1829–1884), acting governor of Montana Territory
 Benjamin West (1746–1817), lawyer
 Francis H. West (1825–1896), Union brigadier general during the Civil War
 Alexander Hamilton Willard (1777–1865), blacksmith who joined the Lewis and Clark Expedition

Notes

References

External links

 
 Silsby Free Public Library
 The Fort at Number Four
 New Hampshire Economic and Labor Market Information Bureau Profile

 
Towns in Sullivan County, New Hampshire
New Hampshire populated places on the Connecticut River
Towns in New Hampshire